Benoy Krishna Basu ( Binôe Boshu) or Benoy Basu or Benoy Bose (11 September 1908 – 13 December 1930) was an Indian revolutionary against British rule in India, who launched an attack on the Secretariat Building; the Writers' Building at the Dalhousie square in Kolkata, along with Badal Gupta and Dinesh Chandra Gupta.

Early life
Basu was born on 11 September 1908, in the village Rohitbhog in the Munshiganj District, then in British India. His father, Rebatimohan Basu was an engineer.

References

Bibliography
 Hemendranath Dasgupta, Bharater Biplab Kahini, II & III, Calcutta, 1948;
 Ramesh Chandra Majumdar, History of the Freedom Movement in India, III, Calcutta 1963;
 Ganganarayan Chandra, Abismaraniya, Calcutta, 1966.

1908 births
1930 deaths
Revolutionary movement for Indian independence
Revolutionaries of Bengal during British Rule
Indian revolutionaries
20th-century Bengalis
Bengali Hindus
People from Munshiganj District
People from Bikrampur
Indian independence activists from West Bengal